Yovani López (born 23 March 1975) is a Colombian cyclist. He competed in the men's team pursuit at the 1996 Summer Olympics.

References

1975 births
Living people
Colombian male cyclists
Olympic cyclists of Colombia
Cyclists at the 1996 Summer Olympics
Place of birth missing (living people)
20th-century Colombian people